Miguel Inclán (1897–1956) was a Mexican film actor. He became known for his villainous roles during the Golden Age of Mexican cinema.

Selected filmography

 Nobleza ranchera (1938) - Pánfilo
 The Cemetery of the Eagles (1939) - Gral. Pedro Ma. Anaya
 United But Not Mixed (1939) - Sisebuto Corrales
 Heart of a Child (1939) - Señor Precusa
 Los olvidados de Dios (1940) - Macario Hernández García 'El Gorrión'
 The Hawk (1940) - Gaspar
 Los de abajo (1940) - El meco
 El charro Negro (1940) - Pancho, esbirro de Emilio
 Mala yerba (1940) - Manuel
 El monje loco (1940)
 El Zorro de Jalisco (1941) - 'Sonaja'
 Creo en Dios (1941)
 Neither Blood Nor Sand (1941) - Jefe de Policía
 Cuando los hijos se van (1941) - Patricio Gómez
 El rápido de las 9.15 (1941) - El Anticuario
 Amor chinaco (1941)
 ¡Ay Jalisco... no te rajes! (1941) - Chueco Gallegos
 El barbero prodigioso (1942) - El ciego
 Allá en el bajio (1942) - Chino
 Los dos pilletes (1942)
 La epopeya del camino (1942) - Tata
 Simón Bolívar (1942) - Sargento Pérez
 La isla de la pasión (1942) - Sargento
 The Three Musketeers (1942)
 I'm a Real Mexican (1942) - Pedro
 La vírgen roja (1943)
 La posada sangrienta (1943) - Lázaro Gómez, mayordomo
 El padre Morelos (1943)
 Doña Bárbara (1943) - Melquiades
 El rayo del sur (1943) - Macario García
 Mexicanos, al grito de guerra (1943) - President Benito Juárez
 María Candelaria (1944) - Don Damian
 China poblana (1944) - El Pitarras
 Murallas de pasión (1944)
 The Escape (1944) - Miguel
 Porfirio Díaz (1944)
 El mexicano (1944)
 Rosa de las nieves (1944)
 Adiós, Mariquita linda (1944)
 El criollo (1945) - Coronel
 The Hour of Truth (1945)
 Caminos de sangre (1945) - Ángel Santos
 La selva de fuego (1945) - Rufino
 Volver a vivir (1946)
 Guadalajara pues (1946) - Don Filiberto Correa
 Enamorada (1946) - Capt. Bocanegra
 The Tiger of Jalisco (1947) - Tigre de Pedrero
 Si me han de matar mañana (1947) - Sebastián Rojas
 The Fugitive (1947) - A Hostage
 Nosotros los Pobres (1948) - Don Pilar
 Fort Apache (1948) - Cochise
 Barrio de pasiones (1948)
 Maclovia (1948) - Tata Macario
 Salón México (1949) - Lupe López
 En cada puerto un amor (1949)
 Rayito de luna (1949) - Trujillo
 Tierra muerta (1949)
 El rencor de la tierra (1949)
 Cuando los hijos odian (1950) - Ramón González
 Aventurera (1950) - Rengo
 Los Olvidados (1950) - Don Carmelo, el ciego
 Los hijos de la calle (1951) - Nieves
 La tienda de la esquina (1951) - Don Ramón Suárez
 El Siete Machos (1950) - Toño
 Los pobres siempre van al cielo (1951) - Padre Bernardo
 My General's Women (1951) - Blas
 Indian Uprising (1952) - Geronimo
 Looks that Kill (1954) - Paco
 Reto a la vida (1954)
 El águila negra (1954) - Ciriaco
 The White Rose (1954) - Manuel Altamirano
 Sombra verde (1954) - Máximo
 María la Voz (1955) - Bernabe, abuelo de Andres
 El plagiario (1955)
 Seven Cities of Gold (1955) - Schrichak (uncredited)
 Fuerza de los humildes (1955)
 Bandido (1956) - Priest (final film role)

References

Bibliography
 Rogelio Agrasánchez. Guillermo Calles: A Biography of the Actor and Mexican Cinema Pioneer. McFarland, 2010.

External links

1897 births
1956 deaths
Mexican male film actors
Male actors from Mexico City